Platinum(IV) chloride is the inorganic compound of platinum and chlorine with the empirical formula PtCl4. This brown solid features platinum in the 4+ oxidation state.

Structure
Typical of Pt(IV), the metal centers adopt an octahedral coordination geometry, {PtCl6}. This geometry is achieved by forming a polymer wherein half of the chloride ligands bridge between the platinum centers. Because of its polymeric structure, PtCl4 dissolves only upon breaking the chloride bridging ligands. Thus, addition of HCl give H2PtCl6. Lewis base adducts of Pt(IV) of the type cis-PtCl4L2 are known, but most are prepared by oxidation of the Pt(II) derivatives.

Formation and reactions
PtCl4 is mainly encountered in the handling of chloroplatinic acid, obtained by dissolving of Pt metal in aqua regia. Heating H2PtCl6 gives PtCl4:
H2PtCl6 → PtCl4 + 2 HCl
If excess acids are removed, PtCl4 crystallizes from aqueous solutions in large red crystals of pentahydrate PtCl4·5(H2O), which can be dehydrated by heating to about 300 °C in a current of dry chlorine. The pentahydrate is stable and is used as the commercial form of PtCl4.

Treatment of PtCl4 with aqueous base gives the [Pt(OH)6]2− ion. With methyl Grignard reagents followed by partial hydrolysis, PtCl4 converts to the cuboidal cluster [Pt(CH3)3(OH)]4. Upon heating PtCl4 evolves chlorine to give PtCl2:
PtCl4 → PtCl2 + Cl2

The heavier halides, PtBr4 and PtI4, are also known.

References
 Cotton, S. A. Chemistry of Precious Metals, Chapman and Hall (London): 1997. .

Chlorides
Chlorides,4
Platinum group halides